Basant is a spring time kite flying event during the Basant Panchami festival in the Punjab. It falls on Basant, also called Basant Panchami. According to the Punjabi calendar it is held on the fifth day of lunar month of Magha (in late January or early February) marking the start of spring.

Central/Majha Punjab

Amritsar, Lahore,  and Kasur are the traditional areas where kite flying festivals are held. A popular Basant Mela is held in Lahore (see Festivals of Lahore). However, the festival has also been traditionally celebrated in areas such as Sialkot, Gujranwala and Gurdaspur.

Historically, Maharaja Ranjit Singh held an annual Basant fair and introduced kite flying as a regular feature of the fairs held during the 19th
 century which included holding fairs at Sufi shrines. Maharaja Ranjit Singh and his queen Moran would dress in yellow and fly kites on Basant. The association of kite flying with Basant soon became a Punjabi tradition with the centre in Lahore which remains the regional hub of the festival throughout the Punjab region. Indeed, Maharaja Ranjit Singh held a darbar or court in Lahore on Basant which lasted ten days during which time soldiers would dress in yellow and show their military prowess. Other traditions of the Basant in Lahore included women swaying on swings and singing.

Malwa, Punjab, India
The festival of Basant is celebrated across Malwa, Punjab where people organize gatherings to fly kites. In areas such as Firozpur, children generally fly kites to mark the auspicious occasion. A large fair is organised on the day of Basant Panchmi in the Shiva temple of Bansari and Gudri which is located in Dhuri, Sangrur district.  The fair includes swings, rides and food.

Punjab, Pakistan

In North India, and in the Punjab province of Pakistan, Basant is considered to be a seasonal festival and is celebrated as a spring festival of kites.  The festival marks the commencement of the spring season. In the Punjab region (including the Punjab province of Pakistan), Basant Panchami has been a long established tradition of flying kites and holding fairs. This includes the Pothohar Plateau where Basant is celebrated in Ralwalpindi, Pakistan with the flying of kites.  Despite the ban on flying kites, kite enthusiasts still continue to celebrate the festival. According to The Express Tribune "in spite of a ban, kites of all sorts, spindles, twines are available freely in the old city area" of Rawalpindi in 2020.  People also light fireworks and play loud music.

Ban
While the date of Basant Panchami is set by a traditional Hindu calendar, the date of the Basant kite festival in Lahore, Pakistan until 2007 was determined by the authorities, always on a Sunday and usually at the end of February or the beginning of March. In 2007, the festival was banned, primarily because of an increasing number of deaths and serious injuries. These had various causes related to the festival, including:

Another reason cited for the ban was the cost to the electricity power transmission system related to 
 
It has been widely reported in Pakistan since 2017 that the ban is to be lifted, however as of 2019 this has not happened. In 2004, Nawa-i-Waqt, a Pakistani daily opposed Basant Panchami celebrations in Pakistan, arguing that the festival celebrated Haqiqat Rai's insult of Muhammad.

Gallery

See also
 Saraswati Puja
 Vasanta (Ritu)
 Vasant
 Festivals of Lahore

References

 
Festivals in Punjab, Pakistan
Kite festivals
Cultural festivals in India
Cultural festivals in Pakistan
Sports festivals in India